Norma Whalley (? – 1954) was an Australian theatre and film actress active in the United States and Britain.

Biography
Whalley was the daughter of Henry Octavius Whalley, a doctor working in Sydney, Australia.

During the late 1890s she toured South Africa, meeting Paul Kruger, president of the Transvaal Republic soon after the Jameson Raid.

In 1901 she was married to J. Sherrie Matthews, an American vaudeville performer, who since mid-1900 had been prevented from working due to ill health, and by 1902 was permanently disabled after a stroke of paralysis.

In 1904 she divorced Matthews to marry barrister Percival Clarke (1872–1936), later Sir Percival, son of Sir Edward Clarke.

Acting career

Theatre
Whalley was brought to the United States for a production by George Edwardes.

She worked in the Chicago and New York for several years from the late 1890s. Whalley appeared in the Broadway production of The Man in the Moon between April and November 1899.

Selected filmography
 Mr. Gilfil's Love Story (1920)
 Colonel Newcome (1920)
 Greatheart (1921)
 The Mystery of Mr. Bernard Brown (1921)
 Open Country (1922)
 The Pointing Finger (1922)
 The Pauper Millionaire (1922)
 Half a Truth (1922)
 The Crimson Circle (1922)
 A Gipsy Cavalier (1922)
 The Knight Errant (1922)
 The Experiment (1922)
 Sliver Blaze (1923)
 The Virgin Queen (1923)
 The Luck of the Navy (1927)
 Bitter Sweet (1933)
 This Is the Life (1933)
 The Camels Are Coming (1934)

References

External links

Year of birth unknown
Year of death unknown
Australian stage actresses
Australian film actresses
Australian silent film actresses
20th-century Australian actresses
19th-century Australian women
Australian expatriate actresses in the United Kingdom
Australian expatriate actresses in the United States
Australian expatriates in South Africa